The Bolshaya Rassokha is a river in Perm Krai, Russia, a right tributary of Bolshoy Ashap which in turn is a tributary of Iren.

References 

Rivers of Perm Krai